Kiran Carrie Chetry (born August 26, 1974) is a former American television broadcast journalist who, until 2011, was a cable news anchor for CNN's American Morning. From 2001 to 2007 she reported—and then anchored—cable news at Fox News.

Early life and education
Kiran was born in Patan Hospital (Shanta Bhawan), Patan, Nepal. Seven months later her parents moved their new family to the United States. Her surname, Chetry, refers to the traditional caste of rulers and soldiers among Hindus in the Middle Hills of Nepal. Kiran's father Hom Chetry belongs to this community. Kiran's mother Nancy is of German, Ukrainian, and Dutch ancestry. Her parents met while Nancy was a Peace Corps Volunteer in Nepal. Kiran grew up in Gaithersburg, Maryland and attended Montgomery Blair High School in Silver Spring, Maryland, where she served in student government, danced on the pom squad, and competed on the swim team. Upon graduation she enrolled at the University of Maryland, College Park's College of Journalism, where she joined the Alpha Pi chapter of Delta Delta Delta sorority and received her Bachelor of Arts in broadcast journalism.

Career
Chetry began her career in 1995 at News 21 in Rockville, Maryland. The next year she moved to WICU-TV in Erie, Pennsylvania, where she was the main anchor and health reporter. (She met her future husband Chris Knowles there who was the prime-time news anchor.) She received the Best Enterprise Reporting award from the Pennsylvania Associated Press Broadcasters Association in 1997 for her series "Young and Hooked," which looked at teen smoking. In 1999 Chetry went from WICU-TV to KXTV in Sacramento, California to work as a morning anchor and reporter until joining Fox News Channel.

In 2001 Chetry joined the cable news network Fox News Channel as a general reporter, first appearing on March 8, 2001, in a story about eating ice cream. The next year Chetry was honored with the Making our Mark (MOM) Award from the Association of Nepalis in the Americas. During her time at Fox News, she worked as a rotating anchor for Fox News Live and the early morning news program Fox & Friends First. In late 2005, she became a regular co-host on the network's weekend morning news program, Fox & Friends Weekend.

Departure from FNC 
In early 2007, as Chetry's contract with Fox News neared the end of its term, the network negotiated with Chetry's agent to renew her contract. Her contract was expected to be renewed with her continuing to co-host Fox & Friends Weekend. However, talks ended when Fox News claimed in a February 15, 2007, letter to Chetry's agent, that Chetry had demanded "that Fox News include a clause in her new agreement that would have been detrimental to other Fox News Talent." The cable news network added that it would not renew her contract and that she was free to leave before the expiration of her contract: Chetry exercised that option. Allegedly, Chetry wanted a clause in her contract that would have had Gretchen Carlson, a co-anchor of Fox & Friends, fired. Chetry's agent countered that the allegation of Chetry's wanting Carlson fired was "absolutely false".  Another source said that the clause in question merely requested a written clarification of whether Chetry would become a "Fox & Friends" co-host and, if so, when. If that were not to happen by a certain date, then Chetry would have a window to exit her new contract.

American Morning co-anchor 
Reportedly, CNN signed Chetry within an hour of her release from the Fox News Channel. On February 16, 2007, Chetry began work as a CNN anchor and correspondent. That very day she served as a co-host on American Morning in the morning, and anchored Anderson Cooper 360 that evening. She went on to substitute as an anchor for Paula Zahn Now and CNN Newsroom.

On April 4, 2007, CNN's President Jonathan Klein officially announced Chetry as the new co-anchor. Her first American Morning broadcast was on April 16, 2007. Her last day on American Morning and at CNN was July 29, 2011.

In August 2014, she co-anchored with Errol Barnett a few late-night telecasts for CNN International.  She was recently an infomercial presenter for Nutribullet.

Sex symbol
In 2006, Chetry made Maxim magazine's top-ten list of TV's sexiest news anchors, placing third on the list: she was ranked as America's sexiest female anchor and the world's second-sexiest female anchor.

Personal life
Chetry was divorced from Chris Knowles, a former Fox News Channel and New York City WPIX-TV weekend weathercaster in 2013. They have a son and a daughter. Unlike other Nepalese Americans, Chetry is a Christian.

See also

 New Yorkers in journalism

References

External links

 
 Q&A: Kiran Chetry: On Career Transition, Nepal and Journalism, Nepal Monitor, July 8, 2007
FNC loses Kiran: Fox to CNN, Carpe Diem

1974 births
American people of Nepalese descent
Living people
People from Lalitpur District, Nepal
Television anchors from Sacramento, California
University of Maryland, College Park alumni
Fox News people
CNN people
American women journalists of Asian descent
American women television journalists
Christians from Maryland
Journalists from Maryland
Nepalese people of European descent
21st-century American women